Marcelo Araujo stage name and professional pseudonym of Lázaro Jaime Zilberman (born June 12, 1947), an Argentine sports journalist. He worked from 1989 to 2004 on Fútbol de Primera. In 2008 he was against Julio Grondona, the president of the AFA; in 2011 he supported him. Is a Play by Play narrator of Gillette Prestobarba Excel Open Tournament vía TyC Max (live broadcast matches) and TyC Sports (tape-delay matches)

References

Argentine sports journalists
Argentine Jews
People from Buenos Aires
1947 births
Living people
Argentine people of Polish-Jewish descent